Max Fischer  (6 May 1927 – 11 July 2015) was a German politician and a representative of the Christian Social Union of Bavaria.

See also
List of Bavarian Christian Social Union politicians

References

Christian Social Union in Bavaria politicians
1927 births
2015 deaths
Grand Crosses with Star and Sash of the Order of Merit of the Federal Republic of Germany